Stepan Company is a manufacturer of specialty chemicals headquartered in Northbrook, Illinois. The company was founded in 1932 by Alfred C. Stepan, Jr., and has approximately 2,000 employees. It is currently run by his grandson, F. Quinn Stepan, Jr. The company describes itself as the largest global merchant manufacturer of anionic surfactants, which are used to enhance the foaming and cleaning capabilities of detergents, shampoos, toothpastes, and cosmetics.

History
In its earliest days, Stepan Company was just Alfred C. Stepan Jr., who began distributing chemical products to control road dust on country roads in Illinois. His first location was a rented desk at Chicago’s North Pier Terminal.

Products
Stepan produces a wide array of industrial chemicals used as raw materials to make end products in the following industries: Agriculture, Antimicrobial, Beverages, Construction, Dietary Supplements, Emulsion Polymerization, Flavors, Food, Household, Institutional, and Industrial Cleaning, Industrial Products, Laundry and Cleaning, Nutrition, Nutritional Powders, Oilfield, Personal Care, Pharmaceutical, Phthalic Anhydride, and Polyester Polyols (for coatings, adhesives, sealants, elastomers, powder coating resins, and rigid foam).

Coca extraction
Coca-Cola includes a coca leaf extract as an ingredient prepared by a Stepan Company plant in Maywood, New Jersey. The facility, which had been known as the Maywood Chemical Works, was purchased by Stepan in 1959. The plant is the only commercial entity in the United States authorized by the Drug Enforcement Administration to import coca leaves, which come primarily from Peru via the National Coca Company. Approximately 100 metric tons of dried coca leaf are imported each year. The cocaine-free extract is sold to The Coca-Cola Company for use in soft drinks, while the cocaine is sold to Mallinckrodt, a pharmaceutical firm, for medicinal purposes.

See also
 Legal status of cocaine
 National Coca Company

References

External links
Stepan Company

Cocaine in the United States
Companies listed on the New York Stock Exchange
Companies based in Cook County, Illinois
Northfield, Illinois
Chemical companies of the United States
Coca